Arme, syndige menneske is a 1980 Norwegian drama film directed by Egil Kolstø, starring Svein Scharffenberg and Anne Marie Ottersen. Journalist Erik Mogensen (Scharffenberg) from Oslo travels to Copenhagen to report on drug abuse in the city. Mogensen himself struggles with alcoholism, and has previously been committed to a mental institution. During his stay in Copenhagen, his drinking problem gets worse.

External links
 
 Arme, syndige menneske at Filmweb.no (Norwegian)

1980 films
1980 drama films
Norwegian drama films
1980s Norwegian-language films